Mireya Dorotea Correa Arroyo (February 6, 1940 November 22, 2022) was a Panamanian botanist and plant taxonomist known for her work with the flora of Panama.

Career 
Correa graduated from the University of Panama with a degree in biology and chemistry in 1963. She received a master's degree in botany from Duke University in Durham, North Carolina in 1967. Her area of expertise was the systematic study of vascular plants with emphasis of the flora of Panama. She was a professor at the University of Panama and pioneered formal botanical studies in Panama. She became a scientific collaborator at the Smithsonian Tropical Research Institute in 1987.

She was the Director of the Herbarium at the University of Panama, a research and teaching facility of the Natural Science Faculty from the time of its founding in 1968. The collection contains more than seventy thousand specimens. It has been part of the Network of Mesoamerican and Caribbean Herbaria since 1995. She created an online database that digitized 12,000 of the specimens and records of the herbarium.

Works

Awards 
 2008 - Medal José Cuatrecasas for Excellence in Tropical Botany.
 2008 - Emeritus Scientist of the Year offered by the Asociacion para el avance de la Ciencia (APANAC).

References

External links 
  (Archived; in Spanish)

1940 births
2022 deaths
Women botanists
Panamanian women scientists
Panamanian women writers
University of Panama alumni
Duke University alumni
Smithsonian Institution people
20th-century botanists
21st-century botanists
20th-century non-fiction writers
21st-century non-fiction writers
20th-century Panamanian women writers
21st-century Panamanian women writers